Borrasca humana is a 1940 Mexican film. It stars Carlos Orellana.

Cast

Julio Ahuet		
Crox Alvarado		
José Bohr		
Elena D'Orgaz		
Lucy Delgado		
Tito Novaro		
Carlos Orellana		
Armando Velasco

External links
 

1940 films
1940s Spanish-language films

Mexican black-and-white films
Mexican drama films
1940 drama films
Films directed by José Bohr
1940s Mexican films